Aditya Langthasa is an Indian politician. In 2006 he was elected as MLA of Hojai Vidhan Sabha Constituency in Assam Legislative Assembly. He is an All India United Democratic Front politician.

References

Year of birth missing (living people)
All India United Democratic Front politicians
Living people
Assam MLAs 2006–2011